The Staithes Sandstone Formation is a geological formation in North Yorkshire, England. Part of the Lias Group, it is Pliensbachian in age. The lithology consists of silty sandstones, with varying argillaceousness. Typically intensely bioturbated and with many bedding structures.

References

Pliensbachian Stage
Jurassic England
Jurassic System of Europe